Queen Bee is a 1955 American film starring Joan Crawford, John Ireland, Betsy Palmer, and Barry Sullivan. The film was directed by Ranald MacDougall and produced by Jerry Wald. The screenplay by MacDougall was based upon the 1949 novel The Queen Bee by Edna L. Lee.

The film tells the story about a Southern family dominated by a ruthless woman and the havoc her threats and intimidation cause to those around her.

Plot
Eva Phillips (Joan Crawford) dominates her Georgia mansion and her husband Avery (Barry Sullivan), an alcoholic mill owner who hates his wife. A cousin, Jennifer Stewart (Lucy Marlow), is pressured into moving in with the family, and she watches in horror as Eva maneuvers to prevent the marriage of Avery's sister Carol (Betsy Palmer) to Judson Prentiss (John Ireland). Carol tells Jennifer to watch out for Eva, and that she read a book about bees and feels that Eva is like a queen bee who stings all her competitors to death.  Jennifer refuses to believe such bad sentiments about Eva, and eventually becomes the putative personal assistant to Eva.

That same night, Eva and Jud have a meeting in a darkened room where he tells her that their relationship and anything they had together was over because he is marrying Carol. Eva rejects this and begins to kiss him, but Judson stops kissing her after a few seconds once he realizes that he is falling back into her trap. Meanwhile, Jennifer witnesses this rendezvous from the top of the staircase and is shocked. Jud turns the light on and tells Eva that he is serious, and she warns him that he will ultimately be sorry for refusing her. When Carol and Jud's engagement is announced to Eva, Eva strongly hints at her former affair with Jud, and Carol commits suicide by hanging herself in the barn.

Jennifer and Avery are drawn together and share a furtive kiss when he tells her that he is aware of Eva and Jud's past. Eva senses the developing relationship and increases her malevolent actions, and tells Avery to not interact with Jennifer any longer. When he refuses, she threatens a scandalous divorce in the press. Meanwhile, Jud, still guilty over Carol's death, leaves the house for a few weeks, but comes back one day for work. He finds out from Jennifer that it was really Eva who told Carol about his earlier relationship with Eva, not Avery as he had assumed. Now, for different reasons, both men are determined to avenge it.

Avery changes his attitude completely, and acts as though he is in love with Eva.  She changes her attitude and says that she is done being manipulative because her husband finally loves her. However, Jud sees through the charade and confronts Avery that his true motives for being nice to Eva is so that she will trust him enough so that he can kill her. Jud preempts his plan on the night Avery intends to commit murder-suicide and takes Eva driving. When Eva discerns that he wants her dead, she frantically attacks him, resulting in a crash over a cliff, killing them both. Now, Jennifer and Avery are free to love each other.

Cast

 Joan Crawford as Eva Phillips
 John Ireland as Judson Prentiss
 Betsy Palmer as Carol Lee Phillips
 Barry Sullivan as Avery Phillips
 Lucy Marlow as Jennifer Stewart
 William Leslie as Ty McKinnon
 Fay Wray as Sue McKinnon
 Bill Walker as Sam the butler (uncredited)
 Katherine Anderson as Miss Breen
 Tim Hovey as Ted Phillips
 Linda Bennett as Tessa Phillips

Reception
Bosley Crowther of The New York Times noted "[Miss Crawford] is the height of mellifluous meanness and frank insincerity." William K. Zinsser of the New York Herald Tribune wrote "Miss Crawford plays her role with such silky villainy we long to see her dispatched."

Accolades
Queen Bee was nominated in two categories at the 28th Academy Awards in 1956 for Best Cinematography (Charles Lang) and Best Costume Design, Black-and-White (Jean Louis).

Home media
Queen Bee was released on Region 1 DVD by Sony Pictures Home Entertainment in 2001. It was also re-released on DVD in the TCM Vault Collection four disc DVD set "Joan Crawford in the 1950s" in November 2012. On November 8, 2013, it was re-released again on DVD as part of Sony Pictures' "Choice Collection" online program. Before all of the DVD releases, the film was put on VHS in the early 1990s.

See also
List of American films of 1955

References

External links
 
 
 
 
 

1955 films
1955 drama films
1955 directorial debut films
American black-and-white films
American drama films
Columbia Pictures films
1950s English-language films
Film noir
Films scored by George Duning
Films based on American novels
Films directed by Ranald MacDougall
Films produced by Jerry Wald
Films set in Georgia (U.S. state)
Films with screenplays by Ranald MacDougall
1950s American films
English-language drama films